Gail Russell (born Betty Gale Russell; September 21, 1924 – August 26, 1961) was an American film and television actress.

Early  years
Gail Russell was born to George and Gladys (Barnet) Russell in Chicago and then moved to the Los Angeles area when she was a teenager. Her father was initially a musician but later worked for Lockheed Corporation. Before she ventured into acting, she had planned to be a commercial artist. Her beauty saw her dubbed "the Hedy Lamarr of Santa Monica."

Career and life
Russell's beauty brought her to the attention of Paramount Pictures in 1942, and she signed a long-term contract with that studio when she was 18. Although she was almost clinically shy and had no acting experience, Paramount had great expectations for her and employed an acting coach to work with her.

She later said, "suddenly there was this terrific amount of work for myself and no time to myself. It was that way for ten years."

At the age of 19 she made her film debut in the 1943 film Henry Aldrich Gets Glamour. She also had a small part in Lady in the Dark (1943) and was meant to play a role in Henry Aldrich Haunts a House when, in March 1943, she was cast in a key role in The Uninvited (1944) with Ray Milland. Joan Mortimer played her role in Henry Aldrich instead.

Stardom
The Uninvited was directed by Lewis Allen and was a big success. Producer Charles Brackett wrote that filming with Russell proved difficult; he said that she would cry on set with her mother, claiming she had a sore throat, but in fact, Russell was crying because Director Lewis Allen had made her wear a hat for a scene which she did not want to wear. Allen said that Ray Milland would take Russell aside and continuously practice her lines with her. Allen also said, "She could only do about five or six lines, and then she'd burst into tears." According to Allen, Russell, who had not drunk alcohol before, began drinking it to calm herself at the suggestion of the head of make-up on set.  

According to the National Box Office Digest, it was among the highest-grossing pictures in the United States with rentals of over $500,000. A delighted Paramount announced Russell for Her Heart in her Throat and True to the Navy with Eddie Bracken.

Allen directed Russell in Our Hearts Were Young and Gay (1944), in which she co-starred with Diana Lynn. It was another success.

Russell co-starred opposite Alan Ladd in Salty O'Rourke (1945), a horse racing drama.

Her Heart in Her Throat became the third film Russell made with Allen, The Unseen (1945), an unofficial follow up to The Uninvited. True to the Navy became Bring On the Girls; Russell did not appear in that film.

Then she and Lynn were in Our Hearts Were Growing Up (1946), a sequel to Our Hearts Were Young and Gay. Paramount announced her as the female lead in The Virginian (1946) but she did not appear in the final movie.

She was reunited with Ladd in Calcutta (1947), shot in 1945 but not released until two years later. She made a cameo as herself in two all-star Paramount films, Duffy's Tavern (1945) and Variety Girl (1947).

Loan-outs

Russell was borrowed by Andrew Stone for The Bachelor's Daughters (1946) at United Artists.

Republic Pictures borrowed her to be John Wayne's leading lady in a film Wayne was producing, Angel and the Badman (1947). Also at Republic she did Moonrise (1948) for Frank Borzage.

Russell returned to Paramount for Night Has a Thousand Eyes (1948), directed by John Farrow, who had made Calcutta. She reteamed with Wayne at Republic for Wake of the Red Witch (1948), which was a hit.

She appeared in a Western with John Payne for Pine-Thomas Productions, a production outfit who released through Paramount, El Paso (1949). Pine-Thomas normally made lower-budgeted films but El Paso was made on a bigger scale.

Russell did Song of India (1949) for Columbia and The Great Dan Patch (1949) for United Artists.

Russell married actor Guy Madison on 1 August 1949. They separated in less than six months but later reunited, then separated in 1953, and divorced in 1954.

She made some more Pine-Thomas films: Captain China (1950) with Payne, and The Lawless (1951) with Macdonald Carey directed by Joseph Losey.

By 1950 it was well known that she had become a victim of alcoholism. According to Yvonne de Carlo, actress Helen Walker took Russell "under her wing and introduced her to the tranquilizing benefits of vodka" when they were Paramount contractees together. Russell was already drinking on set by her third film, 1944's The Uninvited, to ease her paralyzing stage fright and lack of confidence. Paramount did not renew her contract. 

She made Air Cadet (1951) for Universal then did not act for a number of years.

Legal troubles
In 1953 John Wayne's then-wife claimed during her divorce proceedings that Wayne and Russell had spent the night together. Wayne and Russell denied this.

In November 1953 she was held in jail overnight after being arrested for drunk driving. The following month she and Madison separated permanently.

In January 1954, in a court in Santa Monica, California, Russell pleaded guilty to a charge of drunkenness, receiving a $150 fine. The fine was in lieu of a jail sentence, with the provision that she not use intoxicants or attend night spots for two years. In the same court session, she received a continuance on a charge of driving while drunk.

She sued Madison for divorce in May 1954. The divorce was finalized in October 1954. During the court proceedings Madison claimed that Russell would never do any housework and would not allow visitors or servants in the house.

In October 1954 she was admitted to a hospital in a coma after an attack of hepatitis.

In February 1955 she hit another car containing a couple and their baby while driving. She was fined $50. The couple later sued her for $30,000 and settled out of court.

Comeback
Russell returned to work in a co-starring role with Randolph Scott in the western Seven Men from Now (1956), produced by her friend Wayne and directed by Budd Boetticher. The film and Russell's performance were lauded and she seemed poised to make a comeback.

Russell was expected to follow Seven Men from Now with Madame Courage, again with Boetticher as director, but the film was never made.

Instead Russell appeared in an episode of Studio 57 and had a substantial role in The Tattered Dress (1957).

In April 1957 she was found unconscious on the floor at her home.

On July 5, 1957, she was photographed by a Los Angeles Times photographer after she drove her convertible into the front of Jan's Coffee Shop at 8424 Beverly Boulevard, injuring a janitor. After failing a sobriety test, Russell was arrested and charged with driving under the influence. The janitor sued her for $75,000. She failed to appear at a court appearance and was discovered at home passed out due to drinking. She was fined $420, given a 30-day suspended sentence and put on three years' probation.

She appeared in No Place to Land (1958) for Republic.

She had roles in episodes of The Rebel and Manhunt. "I guess there are still a lot of doubts about me", she said in April 1960. "And this is one of the reasons why I want to get back to the business to prove to people I can do a picture. I'm stronger now. The future looks pretty good."

In November 1960 she was announced for a film with Mark Stevens and George Raft called Cause of Death but it appears to have not been made. She was top billed in her last film, the low-budget The Silent Call (1961).

Death
Russell moved to a small house where she lived alone. She would periodically try to stop drinking then start again. On one occasion she was hospitalized. On August 26, 1961, Russell was found dead in her apartment in Brentwood, Los Angeles, California, at the age of 36. She was found by two neighbors who were concerned they had not seen her for several days. An empty vodka bottle was by her side, and the house was full of empty bottles.

She died from liver damage attributed to "acute and chronic alcoholism" with aspiration of stomach contents as an additional cause. She was also found to have been suffering from malnutrition at the time of her death.  She was buried in Valhalla Memorial Park Cemetery in North Hollywood.

Filmography

Television appearances

Radio appearances

References

External links

 
 
 

Actresses from Chicago
Alcohol-related deaths in California
American film actresses
American television actresses
Burials at Valhalla Memorial Park Cemetery
1924 births
1961 deaths
Paramount Pictures contract players
20th-century American actresses
People from Brentwood, Los Angeles
California Democrats
Illinois Democrats